Anomoeotes nuda is a species of moth of the Anomoeotidae family described by William Jacob Holland in 1897. It is known from Africa where it was found at the River Darde.

References
 Note: The original description appears to misspell the generic name as "Anomooetes". 

Anomoeotidae
Moths described in 1897